Berthoald (died 622) was the Duke of the Saxons during the reign of the Frankish kings Chlothar II and his son Dagobert I, the last ruling Merovingians. He despised Frankish suzerainty and rebelled, but was defeated. His story is told in the Liber Historiae Francorum (727) and the Gesta Dagoberti (830s), both sources partial to the Merovingian kings.

Revolt and death 
In 622, shortly after Chlothar had appointed Dagobert to rule Austrasia, the Frankish kingdom that bordered the Saxons, Berthoald rose in revolt and began marching against him. Dagobert crossed the Rhine and invaded Saxon territory to meet him. In the subsequent battle the Franks were defeated and Dagobert received a strong blow to his helmet, by which a portion of his characteristically long Merovingian hair was lost. He retrieved it and sent it with his armiger to his father, to request his assistance. Chlothar, who was in the Ardennes at the time, gathered an army on hearing the news and left that same night. The Franks under Dagobert then encamped on the river Weser across from Berthoald's army. When Chlothar arrived, Dagobert's Franks applauded so loudly that the Saxons could hear on the other side of the river. Berthoald, however, refused to believe reports that Chlothar had arrived and accused his men of cowardice. Chlothar waded his horse into the river, where the Saxon leader met him. After the king removed his helmet to reveal his long grey hair, Berthoald taunted the Frank: "Retire, for if you defeat me, people will only say you have beaten your slave Berthoald, while if I win the victory, they will say everywhere that the mighty king of the Franks has been killed by his slave." The king, in full armour, then charged him and killed him in single combat, even cutting off his head with his axe. The Saxons were routed in the battle that followed. Their land was plundered and a large number of their adult men were killed.

Historical sources 
The Saxon episode is described briefly in the tenth-century chronicle of Regino of Prüm, who characteristically gets the date wrong (572):

He quotes the first and last lines only:

Notes

Dukes of the Saxons
Saxon warriors
7th-century Saxon people
622 deaths
7th-century rulers in Europe
Year of birth unknown